The SEAT Toledo is a small family car produced by the Spanish manufacturer SEAT, part of Volkswagen Group. The Toledo name was first introduced to the SEAT line up in May 1991 being named after a Spanish city with the same name, with the fourth generation being introduced at the end of 2012, for the model year of 2013. Production ended in February 2019, and the nameplate is currently not in use.



First generation (Typ 1L; 1991)

The initial version of the SEAT Toledo (Typ 1L) was launched as a four-door fastback saloon, and its sales career lasted from May 1991 to March 1999. Technically it was a five-door liftback, as its boot lid opened together with the rear window.

This generation of the Toledo was the first SEAT automobile developed entirely under Volkswagen Group ownership, and it was built on the Golf Mk2 Volkswagen Group A2 platform with a 550-litre boot expandable to 1360 litres when folding rear seats, larger in shape and size than the Volkswagen Jetta/Vento's combined with the advantage of a tailgate.

As saloon versions of small family cars were rare in Europe, it was sometimes considered a large family car due to its overall length and boot size, despite having comparably less rear leg room, and pricing closer to small family cars.

It went on sale in most of Europe in May 1991, though it did not arrive on the British market until October 1991, with the official launch at the London Motorfair.

The Toledo initially featured the then standard range of Volkswagen Group engines for the class, from a base 1.6 L  petrol engine up to one GT version using the 2.0 L  engine.

Later, the Toledo would see the addition of more powerful versions, including a  2.0 GTI 16v, and  1.9 TDI which, like many diesel engines built since 1996 by the Volkswagen Group,  is advertised as capable of running on either mineral diesel or biodiesel.

This model later received a mild facelift in September 1995, and made its début at the 1995 Frankfurt Motor Show. Sales were not strong however, as has been the case for all the generations of the Toledo.

Engine specifications
The following engines were available:

Motorsport

SEAT Toledo Marathon
(1992 to 1994) (2100 cc 330cv)
(1997 to 2001) (PVR 3500 cc)
SEAT Toledo Class 2 
(Championship of France superturisme) 1993 to 1994 (195cv)
(Belgium) 1993 to 1994 (195cv)
(CET) 1994 (195cv)
(CET) Meycom 1995 to 1996 (282cv)
(United Kingdom) 1997 (230cv)

Rebadges

This generation of the Toledo has also been produced by the Chinese manufacturer Chery, and sold under the names of Chery A11, Chery Windcloud and Chery A15, Chery A168, Chery Amulet, Chery Cowin, Chery Qiyun, Chery Flagcloud. Chery acquired the chassis of the 1993 Toledo from a Mexican dealership, after authorisation from SEAT.

Chery Cowin, which is based on the SEAT Toledo, already has an authorisation to market it in Europe, along with Russia and South America. Apart from the Chery rebadged models, the first generation Toledo is also currently built by the Russian car maker TagAZ, rebranded as the Vortex Corda.

Awards
'Carro do Ano' award in 1992, in Portugal

Second generation (Typ 1M; 1998)

The second generation Toledo (Typ 1M) was introduced in 1998, and made its début at the 1998 Paris Motor Show as a four-door notchback saloon. Sales commenced in October 1998. It went on sale there in March 1999.

It was more rounded than the previous first generation shape and had a much more fluid design, although both were products of Giorgetto Giugiaro's Italdesign studio, with the latest generation being influenced by SEAT's chief of exterior design Steve Lewis.

It shared components with its Volkswagen and Škoda PQ34 platform mates, the Volkswagen Bora and the Škoda Octavia, being positioned as the sportiest of the three. In the interior, the dashboard was derived from that of the first generation Audi A3.

It was built on the Volkswagen Golf Mk4 platform, which meant stiff springs to support the load of the large 500 litre boot increased to 830 litres when folding rear seats.

The early models were built at the Volkswagen/Audi plant in Belgium, with improved build quality (compared to the Spanish built previous generation), although the Toledo was still presented as an economic alternative to the lower level of the D-segment, and included in the basic price a high level of equipment.

One of the features most associated with the Spanish model, the tailgate was removed in favour of a more traditional four door saloon boot opening. The following year, the Toledo would be used as the base for a proper hatchback, the SEAT León Mark 1.

Base model was now a crossflow 1.6 litre  petrol engine, followed by a 1.8 litre twenty valve  unit, while the top of the line was represented by the 2.3 litre  VR5 engine (V5).

These three versions all featured a six speed manual transmission. The 130 PS TDI also featured white dials instead of the standard black dials on the 110 and 150 PS TDI models. Production of the Typ 1M Toledo ended in July 2004.

Engine Specifications

Petrol Engines

Diesel Engines

Motorsport

In 2003, SEAT Sport introduced the SEAT Toledo Cupra Mk2 in the European Touring Car Championship (ETCC) with drivers Jordi Gené, Frank Diefenbacher and former British Touring Car Championship winner Rickard Rydell, while the 'SEAT Sport Italia' Toledo Cupra Mk2 with Gianni Morbidelli also participated as an additional team.

As in 2005, the ETCC became the World Touring Car Championship (WTCC), the SEAT Toledo Cupra Mk2 competed in the WTCC from 2005 to 2006. Peter Terting replaced Diefenbacher, while Jason Plato also joined the team for four rounds and Marc Carol for one round.

In 2004 and 2005 SEAT Sport also ran in the British Touring Car Championship with two SEAT Toledo Cupras Mk2 identical to those used in the European Touring Car Championship under the 'SEAT Sport UK' banner. Initially, the SEAT Sport UK cars were campaigned by RML Group although at the end of the year the partnership was dissolved as RML entered the WTCC with Chevrolet and the team was run by Northern South since 2005.

At the wheel were Jason Plato, Rob Huff, James Pickford and Luke Hines. However, there were also independent teams running with SEAT Toledo Cupras Mk2 till the 2009 British Touring Car Championship season, like the Motorbase Performance, the Team Air Cool/GR Asia, the BTC Racing and the Maxtreme teams.

In popular culture
The SEAT Toledo makes an appearance in the Singaporean film of 2007, Just Follow Law, directed by Jack Neo. In this film, it is used by the character Tanya Chew (Fann Wong) and was involved in the rollover collision during a chase in which Lim Teng Zui (Gurmit Singh) confronts her about cutting his bonus due to his incompetence and poor work ethics. It has the vehicle registration plate of SGC 1659U and painted in scarlet red.

Awards
'Die besten Autos' 1999 Award, by the German magazine Auto motor und sport
'Carro do Ano' Award in 2000, in Portugal

Third generation (Typ 5P; 2004)

The third generation Toledo (Typ 5P) was introduced in 2004, and as a production car made its début at the 2004 Paris Motor Show. However, a preview of it had already been revealed at the 2004 Madrid Motor Show, with the presentation of the SEAT Toledo Prototipo. Production lasted from February 2004 to May 2009.

Its bodywork is completely different from the previous two generations: abandoning the traditional three box saloon format, the Toledo Mk3 has a five-door hatchback sedan design penned by Walter de'Silva, although now closer to a compact MPV with the Altea's front section, a high roof, and a rear end inspired by Renault Vel Satis, paying homage to the original Toledo's hatchback/saloon rear.

All pretense of a sporty identity was thrown out, in favour of a more upscale and alternative image. A large five hundred litre DIN boot is an interesting feature, while it can be increased to 1440 litres after folding rear seats. Under the bodywork, the SEAT Toledo uses the same underpinnings as the Volkswagen Golf Mk5.

Updates include the arrival of a  TDI engine in 2006, as well as a tiptronic gearbox in the 2.0 FSI model. A 1.8 L turbocharged version of this engine became available in the middle of 2007.

Engine specifications
The internal combustion engines used are the same as for many other cars in the Volkswagen Group, and are all inline four cylinder engines.

* only for some export markets

Reliability
Along with other SEATs, the Toledo has been a markedly reliable vehicle – more so than the Audi A3 and Volkswagen Golf, with which it shares platforms. In May 2006, Warranty Direct, a provider based in the United Kingdom of mechanical warranties for used cars, rated the Toledo with a higher reliability index compared to the Golf produced over the same period and the Audi A3.

In 2010, and though currently out of production, the Warranty direct's Reliability index marks that the SEAT Toledo still ranks within the list of the United Kingdom's one hundred most reliable cars of the last decade.

Fourth generation (Typ KG; 2012)

SEAT released an Audi A4 (B7) based large family car called the SEAT Exeo in October 2008, with both four door saloon and five door estate bodystyles. The Exeo was not intended as a direct replacement for the Toledo according to the company, although production of the Toledo was ended in May 2009, due to low sales.

A concept car based on the Toledo Mk4 production model was presented at the 2012 Geneva Motor Show. This vehicle is closely related to the Škoda Rapid as a five-door liftback, both are based on an adaptation of the A05+ (PQ25) platform and are assembled in the same Škoda factory in Mladá Boleslav.

The Toledo commenced sales in Spain and Portugal towards the end of 2012, and the rest of Europe and Mexico in the beginning of 2013, with the all new Toledo sitting in between the smaller Ibiza supermini and the larger León small family car.

The Toledo received a five star rating in the Euro NCAP.

The Toledo was pulled from UK sales lineup due to poor sales in November 2018. In February 2019, the Toledo ended production although sales in selected markets continued well into 2020.

Special Editions

Toledo CONNECT

The SEAT Toledo CONNECT is part of a special edition line presented at the 2015 Frankfurt Motor Show. This model is equipped with Full Link Technology and a Samsung Galaxy A3 smartphone. This allows the user to connect to the car and access connectivity features of the SEAT ConnectApp right on the dashboard.

The SEAT Toledo CONNECT is available in a range of exterior body colours that also allow the mirrors and wheels to be customised. Interior details, including stitching are in blue.

Engine specifications

Critical reception
The fourth generation of Toledo received generally negative reviews from critics. In October 2014, Top Gear Magazine placed the Toledo on its list of The Worst Cars You Can Buy Right Now. What Car? awarded it 2 stars out of 5, noting that Toledo is "at odds with the sporty image SEAT likes to portray its cars as having" while also having firm ride. Criticism was targeted towards the hard plastics in its interior as well. On the positive side they've praised Toledo's big boot, rear leg room and frugality. Autocar was slightly more positive, awarding it 3 stars out of 5, calling it a "no-nonsense family car", but criticized its driver appeal and bland design.

Sales and production figures
1,019,636 SEAT Toledos have been produced during 4 generations.

The total production per year of SEAT Toledo cars, manufactured in SEAT is shown in the following table.

References

External links

SEAT.com - official SEAT website

Cars introduced in 1991
Compact cars
Sedans
Hatchbacks
Police vehicles
2000s cars
2010s cars
Toledo
Front-wheel-drive vehicles
Cars powered by VR engines
Touring cars
Cars of Spain